Beaulard is a frazione of the comune of Oulx, Metropolitan City of Turin, Piedmont, Italy. It had been a separate commune before 1928.

It has a railway station.

References

Frazioni of the Metropolitan City of Turin